The Women's Premier League (WPL), currently known as the Deloitte Women's Premier League due to sponsorship reasons with audit firm Deloitte, is the top-flight women's football league in Singapore. It is run by Football Association of Singapore (FAS) and features seven amateur teams.

History 
The WPL started in August 2000 in Singapore.

In 2004, in a similar move to S.League, the WPL invited a foreign team to join the league. Guangzhou Sunray Cave from China joined the WPL.

In 2019, WPL had 10 teams.

During the COVID-19 pandemic in Singapore, WPL was suspended since 2019.

On 28 May 2022, WPL resumed competition and started the 2022 season.

Competition format 
Teams receive three points for a win and one point for a draw. No points are awarded for a loss. Teams are ranked by total points, then goal difference, and then goals scored.

At the end of each season, the club with the most points is crowned league champion. If the points, goal difference, goals scored, and head-to-head results between teams are equal, head-to-head records between the teams are used, followed by a better fair play record.

There is no promotion system in the league but clubs with the least points will be relegated. For three seasons onwards from the 2022 season onwards for three seasons, there will be no relegation to the second-tier Women’s National League.

Clubs 
The following eight clubs are competing in the league during the 2022 season. All matches are held at Yishun Stadium.

Former clubs 

 Bishan Arsenal
 FAS Young Women (2004-)
 Paya Lebar Punggol
 Sengkang Marine

Invited clubs 

 Guangzhou Sunray Cave (2004-)

Players 
The minimum age of players has been raised from 15 to 16. Exceptions are allowed subjected to club's request and FAS's approval. The foreign player quota increased to four from three per club.

Clubs need to register a minimum of 18 players, with a maximum of 25 players in their squads. Each team will be allowed maximum of nine substitutes per match, reduced from 14 substitutes.

Past champions

Sponsorship 
On 4 May 2022, Deloitte became the title sponsor for the WPL for three years. The three-year sponsorship deal includes more than $300,000 with the prize money for the champion increased to $25,000.

Broadcasting 
Games are broadcast on Deloitte's youtube page.

References 

Football competitions in Singapore
Top level women's association football leagues in Asia
Sports leagues established in 2000
2000 establishments in Singapore